A City Surrounded By the Mountains is a documentary (in three parts) by Mahmoud Shoolizadeh, and it introduces the social, cultural and geographical life of the people in Khansar, in the Isfahan province of Iran. In this film, the beauty of nature with the capsized tulips in the very high mountain slope that surrounded the city, and also the people and their cultures are portrayed.

Technical specifications and film crew 
A City Surrounded By the Mountains
Betacam sp, 30mins, Documentary in three parts, Iran, 1988
Researcher, Script writer and Director: Mahmoud Shoolizadeh,
Photographer: Ahmad Dodangeh,
Edit: Ali Tahvildari
Producer: Javad Peyhani ( I.R.I.B, Ch1 )

Iranian documentary films